Philharmonic Hall also known as Philharmonie refers to concert halls that has an inhouse orchestra:
 Elbphilharmonie at Hamburg is one of the most modern acoustically designed concert halls in the world.
 Gewandhaus Philharmonie at Augustusplatz, Leipzig is a concert hall world that houses Gewandhaus Orchestra one of the world's elite orchestra group.
 Berliner Philharmonie at Berlin is a famous concert venue for live orchestra.
 David Geffen Hall at the Lincoln Center for the Performing Arts, New York; known as Philharmonic Hall at its opening in 1962, renamed for Avery Fisher in 1973, and renamed for David Geffen in 2015. 
 Azerbaijan State Philharmonic Hall in Baku, Azerbaijan
 Berliner Philharmonie, home of the Berlin Philharmonic Orchestra
 Philharmonic Hall, Cologne below the level of the Roncalliplatz in Cologne is the Philharmonic Hall, with seating for 2,000 rising in concentric segments of a circle
 Philharmonic Hall, Liverpool
 Philharmonic Hall, London

See also
 Philharmonie (disambiguation)

Architectural disambiguation pages